The Slovak Ice Hockey Federation (SZĽH) is the governing body that oversees ice hockey in Slovakia.

Paul Loicq Award recipient Juraj Okoličány served as chairman and vice-president of the federation from 1990 to 2003.

National teams
 Slovakia men's national ice hockey team
 Slovakia men's national junior ice hockey team
 Slovakia men's national under-18 ice hockey team
 Slovakia women's national ice hockey team
 Slovakia women's national under-18 ice hockey team

References

External links

Slovakia at IIHF.com

Ice hockey governing bodies in Europe
Ice hockey in Slovakia
International Ice Hockey Federation members
Ice